Borja Domínguez Domínguez (born 30 May 1992) is a Spanish footballer who plays as a central midfielder.

Club career
Born in Vigo, Galicia, Domínguez was a Celta de Vigo youth graduate. He made his senior debut with the reserves on 24 April 2011, starting in a 0–4 Segunda División B home loss against CD Guadalajara.

For the 2011–12 campaign, Domínguez was loaned to CD Ourense and Villalonga FC, both in Tercera División.

On 9 July 2015, Domínguez moved to fellow third-tier club Racing de Ferrol, in a season-long loan deal. On 1 July of the following year, after scoring a career-best nine goals, he signed a two-year contract with Segunda División side Córdoba CF.

Domínguez made his professional debut on 20 August 2016, coming on as a second-half substitute for Pedro Ríos in a 1–0 home win against CD Tenerife.

On 31 January 2017, Domínguez joined Oviedo on loan until June. On 6 July, he signed a permanent three-year deal with AD Alcorcón, still in the second tier.

On 24 January 2019, after being rarely used during the campaign, Domínguez was loaned to third division side Pontevedra CF until June. He terminated his contract with the Alfareros on 9 July, and signed a three-year contract with CD Lugo also in the second level just hours later.

On 9 August 2021, Domínguez terminated his contract with Lugo. A day later, Domínguez moved to third division side Racing de Santander on two-years deal.

References

External links

1992 births
Living people
Spanish footballers
Footballers from Vigo
Association football midfielders
Segunda División players
Segunda División B players
Tercera División players
Celta de Vigo B players
CD Ourense footballers
Racing de Ferrol footballers
Córdoba CF players
Real Oviedo players
AD Alcorcón footballers
Pontevedra CF footballers
CD Lugo players